Yorktown Independent School District is a public school district based in Yorktown, Texas (USA).

In 2009, the school district was rated "academically acceptable" by the Texas Education Agency.

Schools
Yorktown High School (grades 9–12)
Yorktown Junior High School (grades 6–8)
Yorktown Elementary School (grades PK-5)
2006 National Blue Ribbon School.

References

External links
 

School districts in DeWitt County, Texas